The 1983 Pittsburgh Open, also known as the Ginny of Pittsburgh,  was a women's tennis tournament played on indoor carpet courts at the Racquet Club in Monroeville, Pennsylvania in the United States that was part of the Ginny Tournament Circuit of the 1983 Virginia Slims World Championship Series. It was the second edition of the tournament and was held from March 7 through March 14, 1983. Unseeded Ginny Purdy won the singles title.

Finals

Singles

 Ginny Purdy defeated  Cláudia Monteiro 6–2, 7–5
 It was Purdy's only title of the year and the 1st of her career.

Doubles

 Candy Reynolds /  Paula Smith defeated  Iwona Kuczyńska /  Trey Lewis 6–2, 6–2
 It was Reynolds' 2nd title of the year and the 10th of her career. It was Smith's only title of the year and the 8th of her career.

Notes

References

External links
 Tournament pamphlet

 
Pittsburgh Open
Pittsburgh Open